Dibenz[a,h]anthracene is an organic compound with the chemical formula C22H14. It is a polycyclic aromatic hydrocarbon (PAH) made of five fused benzene rings. It is a fused five-ringed PAH which is common as a pollutant of smoke and oils. It is white to light yellow crystalline solid. It is stable and highly genotoxic in bacterial and mammalian cell systems, as it intercalates into DNA and causes mutations.

It was first synthesized in 1918.

References

Polycyclic aromatic hydrocarbons